Solid as a Rock is the second studio album by American country music group The Shooters. It was released on April 11, 1989 via Epic Records. The album includes the singles "Borderline", "If I Ever Go Crazy" and "You Just Can't Lose 'Em All".

Track listing

Chart performance

Album

Singles

References

1989 albums
The Shooters albums
Epic Records albums